Laura Frances Robinson is a British scientist who is Professor of Geochemistry at the University of Bristol. She makes use of geochemistry to study the processes that govern the climate. In particular, Robinson studies radioactive elements, as these can be analysed in geological materials. She was awarded the 2010 President's Award of the Geological Society of London.

Early life and education 
Robinson was an undergraduate student at the University of Cambridge, where she studied natural sciences. She moved to the University of Oxford for her graduate studies, where she investigated pleistocene climate chronology. After completing her doctorate, Robinson moved to California.  She was appointed a postdoctoral fellow at California Institute of Technology. At Caltech, worked alongside Jess Adkins on deep sea corals. The research took her on a cruise in the North Atlantic ocean, where she journeyed in a submarine to undersea mountains. On this trip she collected fossils from the sea floor. She studied 16,000 year old coral fossils from the Southern Ocean. This experience inspired her to explore how the Atlantic Ocean changed during climate transitions. She moved to the Woods Hole Oceanographic Institution, where she was made Associate Scientist.

Research and career 
Robinson was awarded the 2010 Geological Society of London President's Award for her contributions to geosciences. In 2011 Robinson moved back to the United Kingdom, where she was appointed to the faculty of the University of Bristol. She was awarded a European Research Council Starting Grant studying changes in chemistry and circulation of the Atlantic Ocean. She makes use of an Agassiz Trawl to collect samples from the floor of the ocean, with a particular focus on deep-sea corals. Robinson was involved with a British Antarctic Survey mission to the South Orkney Islands. The mission took place on the RRS James Clark Ross and investigated the biodiversity in and outside of the South Orkney Islands. For this work she was awarded the Antarctic Service Medal. 

In 2016 she delivered a Ted Talk on the secrets she discovers on the ocean floor.

Selected publications

References 

Geochemists
English women scientists
Alumni of the University of Cambridge
Alumni of the University of Oxford
Academics of the University of Bristol
Year of birth missing (living people)
Living people